Woodlands is a small village situated at the T-intersection of Wombeyan Caves Road and Spring Hill Road in the Southern Highlands of New South Wales, Australia, in Wingecarribee Shire. 

At the 2021 census, there were 294 residents.

Notes and references

Towns of the Southern Highlands (New South Wales)
Wingecarribee Shire